The black-billed magpie (Pica hudsonia), also known as the American magpie, is a bird in the corvid family found in the western half of North America. It is black and white, with black areas on the wings and tail showing iridescent hints of blue or blue-green. It is one of only four North American songbirds whose tail makes up half or more of the total body length (the others being the yellow-billed magpie, the scissor-tailed flycatcher, and the fork-tailed flycatcher).

This species prefers generally open habitats with clumps of trees. It can therefore be found in farmlands and suburban areas, where it comes into regular contact with people. Where persecuted it becomes very wary, but otherwise it is fairly tolerant of human presence. Historically associated with bison herds, it now lands on the backs of cattle to glean ticks and insects from them. Large predators such as wolves are commonly followed by black-billed magpies, who scavenge from their kills. The species also walks or hops on the ground, where it obtains food items such as beetles, grasshoppers, worms, and small rodents.

The black-billed magpie is one of the few North American birds that build a domed nest, which is made up of twigs and sits near the top of trees, usually housing 6–7 eggs. Incubation, by the female only, starts when the clutch is complete, and lasts 16–21 days. The nestling period is 3–4 weeks.

Taxonomy and systematics

Externally, the black-billed magpie is almost identical to the Eurasian magpie (Pica pica), and is considered conspecific by many sources. The American Ornithologists' Union, however, splits it as a separate species (P. hudsonia), on the grounds that its mtDNA sequence is closer to that of California's yellow-billed magpie (Pica nuttalli) than to the Eurasian magpie. If this view is correct, the Korean subspecies of the European magpie, Pica pica sericea, should also be considered a separate species.

It appears that after the ancestral magpie spread over Eurasia, the Korean population became isolated, at which point the species crossed the Bering Land Bridge and colonized North America, where the two American magpies then differentiated. Fossil evidence indicates that the ancestral North American magpie had arrived in its current range around the mid-Pliocene (3–4 mya) and that the yellow-billed magpie lineage split off rather soon thereafter due to the Sierra Nevada uplift and the beginning ice ages. A comparatively low genetic difference, however, suggests that some gene flow between the black-billed and yellow-billed magpies still occurred during interglacial periods until the Pleistocene.

Description

The black-billed magpie is a mid-sized bird that measures  from tip to tail. The tail is made up of long, layered feathers, the middle pair of which protrude farthest of all. The beak is oblong and weakly curved toward the tip. Unlike other members of the Corvidae family, the black-billed magpie is dimorphic in size and weight, though there can be overlap between the sexes.

The black-billed magpie can be distinguished from the similar yellow-billed magpie by its longer tail and by the colour of the beak.

Vocalizations
The vocalizations of the black-billed magpie consist of a number of calls variously described as tweets, coos, purrs, shrills and squawks, but the most common is an alarm call, called a chatter, and described as a ka-ka-ka-ka, sometimes preceded with a skah-skah. This call is very different from that of the Eurasian magpie, and is similar to that of the yellow-billed magpie. At least one Black-billed, living with humans, has learnt to imitate human speech.

Distribution and habitat
The species is non-migratory. It ranges from coastal southern Alaska, southwest Yukon Territory, central British Columbia, Alberta, Saskatchewan, and Manitoba in the north, through the Rocky Mountains down south to all the Rocky Mountain states including New Mexico, Colorado, Utah, Wyoming, Idaho, and some bordering states as well. The range can extend as far east as northern Minnesota and Iowa, with casual records in northern Wisconsin and upper Michigan, but is thought to be limited further east and south by high temperature and humidity. The species is absent in California west of the Cascades and Sierra Nevada ranges, where it is replaced by the yellow-billed magpie.

During the breeding season the preferred habitat is riparian areas with thickets. The predilection for open habitats with clumps of trees means that the species also breeds in some meadows and suburbs. Outside the breeding season, magpies can be found in their breeding habitat but also near feedlots, grain elevators, landfills, and around barns and houses.

Behavior

Breeding and nesting
Adult black-billed magpie pairs stay together year-round and often for life unless one dies, in which case the remaining magpie may find another mate. Divorces are possible: one South Dakota study found low rates of divorce (8%) but one 7-year study in Alberta found divorce rates up to 63%.

Black-billed magpies nest individually, frequently toward the top of trees. Only the nest tree and its immediate surroundings are defended, and so it is possible for nests to be somewhat clumped in a location. When this happens (usually in areas with a limited number of trees or with abundant food resources), a diffuse colony is formed. In this, the black-billed magpie is intermediate between the Eurasian magpie, whose nests are much more spread out because a large territory is defended around each nest, and the yellow-billed magpie, which is always loosely colonial.

Nests are loose but large accumulations of branches, twigs, grass, rootlets, bark strips, vines, needles, and other materials, with branches and twigs constituting the base and framework, while mud is used as anchor and in the nest cup. The nest cup is lined with fine rootlets, grass, and other soft material. Nests almost always include a hood or dome of loosely assembled twigs and branches, and usually have one or more side entrances. Nests are built by both sexes over 40–50 days, starting in February (though later in northern parts of the range). Old nests can be repaired and used, or a new nest can be built on top, with older nests thus reaching 120 cm high by 100 cm wide (48 inches high by 40 inches wide). Other bird species, including small hawks and owls, often use old magpie nests.

The breeding season for magpies is generally from late March to early July. They nest once a year, but may re-nest if their first attempt fails early. The female lays up to thirteen eggs, but the usual clutch size is six or seven. The eggs are greenish grey, marked with browns, and 33 mm (about 1.3 inch) long. Only the female incubates, for 16–21 days. The male feeds the female throughout incubation. Hatching is often asynchronous. Hatched young are altricial, brooded by the female but fed by both sexes. They fly 3–4 weeks after hatching, feed with adults for about two months, and then fly off to join other juvenile magpies. Fledging success (usually 3–4 young per nest) is lower than clutch size; this is not an unusual state of affairs in species with asynchronous hatching, as some nestlings often die of starvation.

Black-billed magpies reach sexual maturity at one or two years of age. The lifespan of the species in the wild is about four to six years.

Feeding

The black-billed magpie is an opportunistic omnivore, eating many types of insects, carrion, seeds, rodents, berries, nuts, eggs, and also garbage and food from pets that are fed outside. Chicks are fed animal matter almost exclusively. Magpies typically forage on the ground, usually walking, sometimes hopping, and sometimes scratching with their feet to turn over ground litter. They sometimes land on large mammals, such as moose or cattle, to pick at the ticks that often plague these animals. They often follow large predators, such as wolves, to scavenge or steal from their kills.

Black-billed magpies are also known to make food caches in the ground, in scatter-hoarding fashion. To make a cache, the bird pushes or hammers its bill into the ground (or snow), forming a small hole into which it deposits the food items it was holding in a small pouch under its tongue. It may, however, then move the food to another location, particularly if other magpies are in the vicinity, watching. Cache robbing is fairly common, so a magpie often makes several false caches before a real one. The final cache is covered with grass, leaves, or twigs. After this, the bird cocks its head and stares at the cache, possibly to commit the site to memory. Such hoards are short-term; the food is usually recovered within several days, or the bird never returns. The bird relocates its caches by sight and also by smell; during cache robbing, smell is probably the primary cue.

Social interactions
Black-billed magpies often form loose flocks outside of the breeding season. Dominance hierarchies typically develop within such flocks, more linearly among males than among females. Dominants can steal food from subordinates. Aggressive interactions also occur at point sources of food. Surprisingly, young males appear dominant over adult males, though this may simply reflect the adults' better overall condition and consequent lack of motivation to engage in fights.  Fights are rare and involve jumps and kicks. Dominance is more generally established through displays, such as stretching the body laterally with the bill raised and the nictitating membrane of the eye flashing (only on the side of the opponent).

Magpies often gather excitedly in trees near the body of a dead magpie, calling loudly, a poorly-understood behaviour called a funeral. Some individuals may approach the body and peck at its wings or tail.

Roosting
Magpies tend to roost communally in winter. Every evening they fly, often in groups and sometimes over long distances, to reach safe roosting sites such as dense trees or shrubs that impede predator movement, or, at higher latitudes, dense conifers that afford good wind protection. In Canada, they arrive at the roosting site earlier in the evening and leave later in the morning on colder days. At the roosting site, they tend to occupy trees singly; they do not huddle. They sleep with the bill tucked under the scapular (shoulder) and back feathers, adopting this position sooner on colder nights. During the night, they may also regurgitate in the form of pellets the undigested parts of what they ate during the day. Such pellets can be found on the ground and then used to determine at least part of the birds' diet.

Flight
Level flight appears slow and labored. As measured in wind tunnels, minimum and maximum sustained flight speeds are 14.5 km/h and 50 km/h (9 mph and 31 mph), respectively. Flight is commonly interrupted by nonflapping phases. Descents from heights consist of repeated J-shaped swoops with the wings nearly closed.

Relationship with humans
When Lewis and Clark first encountered black-billed magpies in 1804 in South Dakota, they reported the birds as being very bold, entering tents and taking food from the hand. Magpies formerly followed American bison herds (from which they gleaned ticks and insects), as well as the bands of Plains Indians that hunted the bison so they could scavenge carcasses. When the bison herds were devastated in the 1870s, magpies switched to cattle, and by the 1960s, they had also moved into the emerging towns and cities of the West. Today, black-billed magpies remain relatively tame in areas where they are not hunted. However, they become very wary in areas where they are often shot at or disturbed. During the first half of the 20th century, black-billed magpies were considered detrimental to game-bird populations (due to them sometimes stealing bird eggs) and domestic stock (pecking at sores on cattle), and were systematically trapped or shot. Bounties of one cent per egg or two cents per head were offered in many states. In Idaho, the death toll eventually amounted to an estimated 150,000. In 1933, 1,033 magpies were shot in Washington's Okanogan valley by two teams of bounty hunters. Many magpies also died from eating poison set out for coyotes and other predators.

If regularly disturbed at the nest, magpie pairs will eventually either move the eggs or abandon the clutch altogether, but in the first instance they will defend the nest aggressively. Biologists who have climbed nest trees to measure magpie eggs have reported that the parents recognized them personally on subsequent days and started to mob them, overlooking other people in the vicinity.  

Many suburban songbird lovers dislike magpies because of their reputation for stealing eggs, but studies have shown that eggs make up only a small proportion of what magpies feed on during the reproductive season, and that songbird populations do not fare worse in the presence of magpies. 

A common misconception about magpies in general is that they like to steal bright or shiny things. This reputation belongs to the Eurasian magpie (Pica pica) rather than the black-billed magpie, and at any rate an experiment conducted at Exeter University has shown that the reputation is undeserved: Eurasian magpies displayed caution around shiny objects rather than being attracted to them.

Status
Because of its wide range and generally stable population, the black-billed magpie is rated as a species of least concern by the International Union for Conservation of Nature.

In the United States, black-billed magpies are protected under the Migratory Bird Treaty Act, but "[a] Federal permit shall not be required to control ... [magpies] when found committing or about to commit depredations upon ornamental or shade trees, agricultural crops, livestock, or wildlife, or when concentrated in such numbers and manner as to constitute a health hazard or other nuisance". State or local regulations may limit or prohibit killing these birds as well. The species is not threatened, and in some areas, it has benefited from forest fragmentation and agricultural developments. Like many corvids, however, it is susceptible to West Nile virus.

In Canada, however, black-billed magpies do not appear on the list of birds protected by the Migratory Birds Convention Act. Provincial laws also apply, but in Alberta, magpies may be hunted and trapped without a license.

A detriment to the overall black-billed magpie population is toxic chemicals, particularly topical pesticides applied on the backs of livestock. Because black-billed magpies sometimes glean ticks off the backs of cattle, this proves a problem.

References

Further reading
 Washington Department of Fish and Wildlife, Living with Wildlife; Facts about Magpies
 Black-billed magpie species account - Cornell Lab of Ornithology
 Black-billed magpie - Birds of the world

External links

 

black-billed magpie
Native birds of Alaska
Birds of the Aleutian Islands
Native birds of the Canadian Prairies
Native birds of Western Canada
Native birds of the Plains-Midwest (United States)
Native birds of the Northwestern United States
Native birds of the Western United States
black-billed magpie
Taxa named by Joseph Sabine